(For the tree oyster mushroom, see Pleurotus ostreatus.)

Isognomon is a genus of marine bivalve mollusks which is related to the pearl oysters.

Isognomon is known in the fossil record from the Permian period to the Quaternary period (age range: 254.0 to 0.012 million years ago). Fossils of species within this genus have been found all over the world.

Taxonomy
This genus is placed in the family Isognomonidae.  However previous molecular phylogeny studies have shown that these tree oysters belong in the family Pteriidae.

Description
They use their byssus to completely immobilize themselves to the roots of mangrove trees, corals, and other substrates. It is because of the preference for mangroves that these are sometimes called tree oysters

Species
 Isognomon alatus (Gmelin, 1791) — Flat tree-oyster
 Isognomon albisoror (Iredale, 1939)
 Isognomon australica (Reeve, 1858)
 Isognomon bicolor (C.B. Adams, 1845)
 Isognomon californicus (Conrad, 1837)
 Isognomon dunkeri (P. Fischer, 1881)
 Isognomon ephippium (Linnaeus, 1758)
 † Isognomon fortissimus (L. C. King, 1933) 
 Isognomon incisum (Conrad, 1837)
 Isognomon isognomum (Linnaeus, 1758)
 Isognomon janus Carpenter, 1857
 Isognomon legumen (Gmelin, 1791)
 Isognomon nucleus (Lamarck, 1819)
 Isognomon perna (Linnaeus, 1767)
 Isognomon radiatus (Anton, 1838) — Lister's tree oyster
 Isognomon recognitus (Mabille, 1895)
 Isognomon vulselloides Macsotay & Campos, 2001

Extinct species

Extinct species within this genus include:
 †Isognomon gariesensis  Kensley and Pether 1986
 †Isognomon gaudichaudi  d'Orbigny 1842
 †Isognomon isognomoides  Stahl 1824
 †Isognomon isognomon  Linnaeus 1758
 †Isognomon isognomonoides  Stahl 1824
 †Isognomon legumen  Gmelin 1790
 †Isognomon maxillatus  Lamarck 1819
 †Isognomon nucleus  Lamarck 1819
 †Isognomon quadrisulcata  Ihering 1897
 †Isognomon valvanoi  Rossi de Garcia and Levy 1977
 † Isognomon wellmani Crampton, 1988 

Species brought into synonymy
 Isognomon acutirostris (Dunker, 1869): synonym of Isognomon nucleus (Lamarck, 1819)
 Isognomon anomioides (Reeve, 1858): synonym of Isognomon australica (Reeve, 1858)
 Isognomon aviculare (Lamarck, 1819): synonym of Isognomon isognomum (Linnaeus, 1758)
 Isognomon brevirostre Link, 1807: synonym of Isognomon isognomum (Linnaeus, 1758)
 Isognomon dentifer (Krauss, 1848): synonym of Isognomon nucleus (Lamarck, 1819)
 Isognomon isognomon (Linnaeus, 1758): synonym of Isognomon isognomum (Linnaeus, 1758)
 Isognomon roberti Koch, 1953: synonym of Isognomon perna (Linnaeus, 1767)
 Isognomon rude (Reeve, 1858): synonym of Isognomon isognomum (Linnaeus, 1758)
 Isognomon rupella (Dufo, 1840): synonym of Isognomon nucleus (Lamarck, 1819)
 Isognomon sulcatum Lamarck: synonym of Isognomon perna (Linnaeus, 1767)
 Isognomon vulsella (Lamarck, 1819): synonym of Isognomon legumen (Gmelin, 1791)

References

 Gofas, S.; Le Renard, J.; Bouchet, P. (2001). Mollusca, in: Costello, M.J. et al. (Ed.) (2001). European register of marine species: a check-list of the marine species in Europe and a bibliography of guides to their identification. Collection Patrimoines Naturels, 50: pp. 180–213 
 Huber M. (2010) Compendium of bivalves. A full-color guide to 3,300 of the world's marine bivalves. A status on Bivalvia after 250 years of research. Hackenheim: ConchBooks. 901 pp., 1 CD-ROM
 Coan E.V. & Valentich-Scott P. (2012) Bivalve seashells of tropical West America. Marine bivalve mollusks from Baja California to northern Peru. 2 vols, 1258 pp. Santa Barbara: Santa Barbara Museum of Natural History.

Pteriida
Bivalve genera